The Danville River (in French: rivière Danville) is a tributary of the east bank of the Landry River whose current flows successively into the Nicolet Southwest River, Nicolet River, Lake Saint-Pierre and St. Lawrence River. It crosses the municipalities of Saint-Georges-de-Windsor, Saint-Claude and Danville in the Les Sources Regional County Municipality (MRC), in the administrative region of Estrie, in Quebec, in Canada.

Geography 

The main neighboring hydrographic slopes of the Danville River are:
 north side: Nicolet River;
 east side: Nicolet Southwest River, Watopeka River;
 south side: Steele brook, Willow brook, Saint-François River;
 west side: Landry River.

The Danville river has its source at the Lévesque dam in the municipality of Saint-Georges-de-Windsor. This dam retains a body of water  in length forming a loop to the south. This body of water is fed by the Jean stream (coming from the north).

  northwesterly, into Danville, passing south of the town of Val-des-Sources, crossing route 116, to its mouth.

The Danville River empties on the east bank of the Landry River. Its confluence is located at:
  (direct line) south of the intersection of route 116 and route 255 of the village of Danville;

Toponymy 
The toponym rivière Danville was made official on December 5, 1968, at the Commission de toponymie du Québec.

See also 

 List of rivers of Quebec

References 

Rivers of Estrie
Les Sources Regional County Municipality